The 1986–87 Honduran Liga Nacional season was the 21st edition of the Honduran Liga Nacional.  The format of the tournament remained the same as the previous season.  Club Deportivo Olimpia won the title after winning the final round and qualified to the 1987 CONCACAF Champions' Cup along with runners-up Real C.D. España.

1986–87 teams

 E.A.C.I. (Isletas, promoted)
 Marathón (San Pedro Sula)
 Motagua (Tegucigalpa)
 Olimpia (Tegucigalpa)
 Platense (Puerto Cortés)
 Real España (San Pedro Sula)
 Sula (La Lima)
 Tela Timsa (Tela)
 Victoria (La Ceiba)
 Vida (La Ceiba)

 E.A.C.I. is from Isletas but played in Olanchito.

Regular season

Standings Group A

Standings Group B

Final round playoff

Final round

Cuadrangular Standings

Top scorer
  Cipriano Dueñas (Vida) with 12 goals

Squads

Known results

Week 1

Round 27

Cuadrangular

Unknown rounds

References

Liga Nacional de Fútbol Profesional de Honduras seasons
1986–87 in Honduran football
Honduras